Vishesh Films is an Indian film company founded in 1986 and currently owned by Mukesh Bhatt. Vishesh Films is one of the most successful Indian film production houses. The production company is named after Vishesh Bhatt, the son of Mukesh Bhatt.

History
In 1987 Mukesh Bhatt turned producer when he set up his own banner, "Vishesh Films", naming it after his son Vishesh Bhatt. He went on to become one of the most recognised banners of the Indian film industry in the coming decade, giving both serious productions (along with his brother Mahesh who directed these films) – like Daddy (1989), launching his niece Pooja Bhatt as a movie actress, — as well as commercial romantic hits like Kabza (1987), Aashiqui (1990) and Dil Hai Ki Manta Nahin (1991), in which he cast Pooja with actor Aamir Khan. He next produced Sadak (1991) which remains his highest grossing work, which was also directed by his brother Mahesh Bhatt under the banner Vishesh Films. He won critical acclaim for Sir (1993), which saw Pooja Bhatt act with Naseeruddin Shah along with the hit Criminal (1995) it.

He went on to produce the film  Tadipaar. Following this, he produced dramas like Dastak (1996), the debut film of Miss Universe 1994-turned-actress Sushmita Sen, and Tamanna (1997),. In 1998 his brother Mahesh Bhatt directed his last directorial venture Zakhm (1998) returned to the censor board because of right-wing pressure critical of its references to the Mumbai riots of 1993 and joined Mukesh Bhatt's production house as a full-time creative head of "Vishesh Films". Thereafter,  the Bhatt brothers joined hands and churned out stories and screenplays for over twenty films, many of which were box-office successes, like Dushman, Raaz, Murder (2004), Gangster (2006), Woh Lamhe (2006), Murder 2 (2011), Jism 2 (2012) and Murder 3 (2013).

Vishesh Films is known for producing small budget commercially successful films and great music.
They produced thrillers like Raaz, Jism, Murder and Gangster all of which were major commercial successes.
They further produced Zeher, Awarapan and Jannat. While the first two were moderate successes, the latter emerged a Super Hit. They then began producing quasi sequels and have given the maximum number of franchises to Indian Cinema. For 30 years Mukesh along with his brother Mahesh produced movies under the banner of Vishesh films. However owing to differences between the brothers, Mukesh Bhatt took over Vishesh films and in May 2021, it was publicly announced that Mahesh Bhatt was no more associated with the firm.

Filmography
The following is a list of films produced under the banner Vishesh Films India PVT. LTD. of Mahesh Bhatt and Mukesh Bhatt

Timeline 1986–2000

Timeline 2001–present

Top-grossing films

References

Film production companies based in Mumbai
Indian companies established in 1988
Hindi cinema